Vít Kopřiva (born 15 June 1997) is a Czech tennis player. He has a career-high ATP singles ranking of No. 124 achieved on 18 July 2022. He also has a career-high doubles ranking of No. 264 achieved on 13 June 2022.
Kopřiva has won 1 ATP Challenger single title at the 2022 UniCredit Czech Open in Prostějov and 1 ATP doubles title at the 2021 Aspria Tennis Cup in Milan with Jiří Lehečka.

Professional career

2021: ATP and Top 200 debut, first top-10 win
On his ATP debut, ranked at a then career-high of World No. 249 in singles, at the 2021 Swiss Open Gstaad, Kopřiva defeated Denis Shapovalov for his career-best and first top-10 win. He was the lowest-ranked player to beat a Top 10 opponent since then World No. 698 Thanasi Kokkinakis defeated then World No. 6 Milos Raonic at The Queen's Club in 2017. Kopřiva advanced to the semifinals after beating Mikael Ymer in straight sets. He was the second player to reach the semifinals on his ATP Tour debut since May 2012, joining 2021 Córdoba champion, Juan Manuel Cerundolo. His run would come to an end in the semifinals against Casper Ruud.

2022: Maiden Challenger title, Top 150 debut
He won his maiden Challenger at the 2022 UniCredit Czech Open in Prostějov defeating his 19-year-old compatriot Dalibor Svrčina 6–2, 6–2. As a result, he reached the top 150 at World No. 146 on 6 June 2022.

Grand Slam singles performance timeline

ATP Challenger and ITF Futures/World Tennis Tour Finals

Singles: 15 (6 titles, 9 runner-ups)

Doubles: 2 (2 titles)

Wins over top 10 players
Kopřiva has a  record against players who were, at the time the match was played, ranked in the top 10.

Notes

References

External links
 
 

1997 births
Living people
Czech male tennis players
People from Bílovec
Sportspeople from the Moravian-Silesian Region